Stanley Michael Bailey Hailwood,  (2 April 1940 – 23 March 1981) was a British professional motorcycle racer and racing driver. He is regarded by many as one of the greatest racers of all time. He competed in the Grand Prix motorcycle world championships from 1958 to 1967 and in Formula One between 1963 and 1974. Hailwood was known as "Mike The Bike" because of his natural riding ability on motorcycles with a range of engine capacities.

A nine-time world champion, Hailwood won 76 Grand Prix races during his motorcycle racing career, including 14 Isle of Man TT victories and four consecutive 500 cc world championships. After his motorcycle racing career concluded, he went on to compete in Formula One and other classes of car racing, becoming one of the few men to compete at Grand Prix level in both motorcycle and car racing. He returned to motorcycle racing at the age of 38, taking victory at the 1978 Isle of Man TT.

Hailwood died in 1981 following a road traffic accident in Warwickshire, England.

Early life
Hailwood was born at Langsmeade House, Great Milton in Oxfordshire, the only son and elder child of Stanley William Bailey Hailwood, a millionaire businessman and managing director of a motorcar sales company as well as successful motorcycle dealer. He had also raced, in the pre-World War II era. Hailwood had a comfortable upbringing; he learned to ride at a young age on a minibike as a small boy in a field near his home. He was educated at Purton Stoke Preparatory School, Kintbury, and Pangbourne Nautical College where he wore a RN cadet uniform, but left early and worked for a short time in the family business before his father sent him to work at Triumph motorcycles.

Motorcycle racing career
Hailwood saw his first race at age 10 with his father, and first spectated at the Isle of Man TT races in 1956.

He first raced on 22 April 1957, at Oulton Park, finishing in 11th place. In 1958 he won ACU Stars at 125 cc, 250 cc, and 350 cc classes, earning him the Pinhard Prize, an accolade awarded yearly to a young motorcyclist under 21, who is adjudged to have made the most meritorious achievement in motorcycle sport during the preceding year. He teamed with Dan Shorey to win the Thruxton 500 endurance race and finished in four classes of TT race with one podium.

 By 1961, Hailwood was racing for up-and-coming Japanese factory Honda. In June 1961, he became the first man in the history of the Isle of Man TT to win three races in one week when he won in the 125 cc, 250 cc and 500 cc categories. He lost the chance at winning a fourth race when his 350 AJS failed with a broken gudgeon pin whilst leading. Riding a four-stroke, four-cylinder 250 cc Honda, Hailwood won the 1961 250cc world championship.

In 1962, Hailwood signed with MV Agusta and went on to become the first rider to win four consecutive 500cc World Championships.

Hailwood then went on to win the GP race, which carried World Championship points, in the afternoon of the same day.

During 1965, Hailwood entered selected UK events riding for the Tom Kirby Team. In heavy rain, Hailwood won the 1965 Hutchinson 100 Production race at the Silverstone circuit on a BSA Lightning Clubman entered by dealer Tom Kirby, beating the Triumph Bonnevilles entered by Syd Lawton. The 'Hutch' was a main production race of the season along with the Thruxton 500, so it was very important for manufacturers to establish the racing potential of their recent models. As this was production-based racing open to all entrants, 'official' works teams were ineligible; instead, machines were prepared and entered through well-established factory dealers. BSA Lightning Clubmans were ridden by Hailwood (carrying number 1 on the fairing) and factory rider Tony Smith, whilst Triumph Bonnevilles were ridden by World Champion Phil Read and works employee Percy Tait. Conditions were poor and Smith retired from the race at slippery Stowe Corner.

After his successes with MV Agusta, Hailwood went back to Honda and won four more world titles in 1966 and 1967 in the 250 cc and 350 cc categories. At the 'Motor Cycle' 500 race at Brands Hatch in 1966, Hailwood demonstrated a Honda CB450 Black Bomber fitted with a sports fairing. It was unable to compete in the 500cc category, the Fédération Internationale de Motocyclisme (FIM) deeming that it was not classified as a production machine as it had two overhead camshafts.

Hailwood enjoyed great success at the Isle of Man TT. By 1967, he had won 12 times on the island mountain course. He won what many historians consider to be the most dramatic Isle of Man race of all time, the 1967 Senior TT against his great rival, Giacomo Agostini.

After suffering breakdowns in 1967, Hailwood had intended to re-sign for Honda provided the 1968 machinery was to his satisfaction, and had relocated to South Africa where he started a building business with former motorcycle Grand Prix rider Frank Perris, completing their first house in October 1967, also selling one to ex-racer Jim Redman. Hailwood stated to Motorcycle Mechanics that even without suitable machinery from Honda he would not go elsewhere, preferring to retire prematurely and he would in any case finish at the end of the 1968 season.

For 1968, Honda pulled out of Grand Prix racing, but paid Hailwood £50,000 (equivalent to over £870,000 at 2020 prices) not to ride for another team, in expectation of keeping him as its rider upon return to competition.

Hailwood continued to ride Hondas during 1968 and 1969 in selected race meetings without World Championship status including European events in the Temporada Romagnola (Adriatic Season of street-circuits), sometimes wearing an unfamiliar plain-silver helmet, including on a 500 cc engined machine which used frames privately commissioned by Hailwood.

Hailwood also appeared in selected UK events, in 1968 appearing in the post-TT race at Mallory Park on a Honda, and in 1969 he participated in the Mallory Park Race of the Year riding a Seeley

He had already started to race cars and with no other factory racing teams available to compete against MV Agusta, Hailwood decided to pursue a career in car racing, placing third in the 1969 Le Mans 24-Hour race in France as a co-driver of a Ford GT40 with David Hobbs.
 
In 1970, Hailwood was again lured back into bike racing, this time by the BSA team riding a Rocket 3 at the Daytona 200 race in Florida, part of a strong BSA/Triumph team. Whilst placed at the head of the field the machine soon failed due to overheating. Hailwood again rode for BSA at the 1971 Daytona race, qualifying on the front row. He led the race but again broke down. Hailwood's son David completed a demonstration lap of the Isle of Man TT course on 3 June 2002, riding his father's Daytona 1971 BSA Rocket 3 carrying large letters 'H' instead of a race number. He crashed at low speed when waving to the spectators at Governor's Bridge, a tight hairpin bend close to the end of the 37-mile course.

Personal life
Coming from a prosperous background, during his early career Hailwood had enjoyed a privileged lifestyle and even before his move from MV to Honda in 1966 was the world's highest-paid rider. He lived a playboy lifestyle as a jet-setter covering 30,000 road miles and 160,000 air miles in a year travelling to circuits around the world whilst based in his bachelor-flat at Heston, West London, where he kept his high-powered sports cars.

In 1964, together with British commentator and journalist Murray Walker, he published the book, The Art of Motorcycle Racing. After relocating to South Africa in 1967, he confirmed to Motorcycle Mechanics in 1968 that he would only be spending the same length of time there as in the previous eight years when he spent two winter months staying at the farm of racer Paddy Driver near Johannesburg. Hailwood also stated "And as far as marriage goes—that's strictly for the birds!"

He had two children: daughter Michelle in 1971 and son David. He married their mother, model Pauline, on 11 June 1975. Pauline Hailwood died in June 2020 following an illness.

Car racing career
During his car racing career, Hailwood raced in Formula One and World Sports Cars, but never achieved the same level of success that he had found on motorcycles. He participated in 50 Formula One Grands Prix, starting with an early phase between 1963–1965, debuting in the British Grand Prix on 20 July 1963, achieving two podium finishes and scoring a total of 29 championship points. He was in contention for a victory at his first Formula One race in six years, the 1971 Italian Grand Prix. The first five finishers were covered by only 0.61 seconds, and Hailwood was fourth, 0.18s behind the winner Peter Gethin.

He won the  Formula Two European title and earned a podium finish at the 1969 24 Hours of Le Mans. Hailwood ran three full seasons in the European Shellsport F5000 series 1969-71 and was 2nd in the 1972 Tasman F5000 series in which he drove a 5000 engined TS8 F1 chassis.

Hailwood was recognised for his bravery when in the 1973 South African Grand Prix he went to pull Clay Regazzoni from his burning car after the two collided on the third lap of the race. Hailwood's driving suit caught fire, but after being extinguished by a fire marshal he returned to help rescue Regazzoni, an act for which he was awarded the George Medal, the second-highest gallantry award that a British civilian can be awarded.

In 1974 he drove a works Yardley-sponsored McLaren M23 and sometimes outpaced team leader Emerson Fittipaldi. He left Formula One after being injured badly at the 1974 German Grand Prix at the Nürburgring and retired to New Zealand, where he was involved with a marine engineering business together with former McLaren manager Phil Kerr.

He was the subject of This Is Your Life in 1975 when he was surprised by Eamonn Andrews.

Comeback
In 1977, Hailwood had travelled to Australia to ride large-capacity Ducatis in long-distance races and a 30-lap event on a Yamaha, together with historic race machines. Achieving some success, he entered a 3-hour long-distance event in April 1978, as before with Australian co-rider Jim Scaysbrook. Also in April, Hailwood rode at the Australian motorcycle Grand Prix, for the first time on a 750 Yamaha that he was later to ride in the Classic TT race.

In May 1978, Hailwood rode a demonstration to spectators at a Donington Park national motorcycle race day of the Yamaha XS1100 with full fairing in Martini colours, which he was to use to re-acquaint himself with the TT course, including any subsequent alterations since he raced at the Isle of Man in the late 1960s. Martini was to sponsor most of his TT race machines provided by the UK Yamaha importer Mitsui. He stayed on for the following Monday to test his Yamaha TZ750, TZ500 and TZ250 race machines together with his F1 TT Ducati which he had previously tested in the rain at Oulton Park.

On 3 June 1978, after an 11-year hiatus from mainstream motorcycling, Hailwood made a comeback at the Isle of Man TT in the Formula I race, a World Championship class based on large-capacity road machines first introduced for 1977.

Few observers believed that the 38-year-old would be competitive at the TT races after such a long absence, but riding a Ducati 900SS provided by Manchester (UK) dealership Sports Motorcycles, he won the F1 race. Machines for other race categories were provided by Yamaha NV (Netherlands); Hailwood finished 12th in the 250 cc Junior event, 28th in the 500 cc Senior race being affected by a faulty steering damper, and a DNF in the Classic (1000 cc) race.

Hailwood was awarded 'Man of the Year' for 1978 after a public vote organised by Motorcycle News weekly newspaper. After the June 1978 TT races, he again rode in Australia with Scaysbrook in the Castrol Six Hour event, followed by the 1979 Adelaide Three Hour race.

Hailwood raced at the 1979 Isle of Man TT before retiring for good at the age of 39. In that final Isle of Man appearance, he rode a two-stroke Suzuki RG 500 to victory in the Senior TT. He then opted to use that same 500 cc bike in the Unlimited Classic and diced for the lead with Alex George (1100cc Honda) for all six laps. A minute or two apart on the road, they were rarely a few seconds apart on time each lap, Hailwood losing by two seconds.

Death

Following his retirement from motor sport, in late 1979 Hailwood established a Honda-based retail motorcycle dealership in Birmingham named Hailwood and Gould, in partnership with former motorcycle racer Rodney Gould.

On Saturday 21 March 1981, Hailwood set off in his Rover SD1 with his children Michelle and David to collect some fish and chips. As they returned along the A435 Alcester Road through Portway, Warwickshire, near their home in Tanworth-in-Arden, a lorry made an illegal turn through the barriers onto the central reservation, and their car collided with it. Michelle, aged nine, was killed instantly. Mike and David were taken to hospital, where Mike died two days later from severe internal injuries. He was 40 years old. David survived with minor injuries. The lorry driver was fined £100.

Hailwood claimed to have been told by a fortune teller in South Africa that he would not live to 40 and would be killed by a truck. The story was repeated by Elizabeth McCarthy in a 1981 memoir, while recounting her relationship with Hailwood, whom she had met at the Canadian Grand Prix in 1967. When he asked for her hand in marriage, she replied that she was hesitant to marry someone who could die at any weekend race. He then told her his story and said; "...I will be killed by one of those damn lorries – so, you see, it won't happen on a track".

Legacy

An annual 'Mike Hailwood Memorial Run' was discontinued after the 2011 event. The starting point was the former Norton factory in Aston, Birmingham, then on to Portway, where the accident occurred, followed by a service at the church in Tanworth-in-Arden.

Hailwood retired with 76 Grand Prix victories, 112 Grand Prix podiums, 14 Isle of Man TT wins and 9 World Championships, including 37 Grand Prix wins, 48 Grand Prix podiums, 6 Isle of Man TT wins and 4 World Championships in 500cc.

He was awarded the Segrave Trophy for 1979 "in recognition of his Isle of Man exploits in the Senior and Classic TTs", with his close friend Ted Macauley also awarded a special Seagrave Medal. Hailwood was the Patron of a small charity – The Joan Seeley Pain Relief Memorial Trust – named in tribute to Colin Seeley's first wife Joan, who died in 1979. The present Patron is Murray Walker.

The FIM named him a Grand Prix "Legend" in 2000. He was inducted into the AMA Motorcycle Hall of Fame in 2000 and the International Motorsports Hall of Fame in 2001.

After Hailwood's victory at the 1978 Isle of Man Formula One motorcycle race, Ducati offered a 900SS-based Mike Hailwood Replica for sale. Approximately 7,000 were sold.

In 1981, a section of the Snaefell Mountain Course was named as Hailwood's Rise leading to the highest point at Hailwood's Height in his honour. In 1984, Pauline Hailwood officially opened the Mike Hailwood Centre, a multi-purpose building located at the TT Grandstand in Douglas run as a refreshment outlet during TT and Manx Grand Prix motorcycle race periods. Operated by the Mike Hailwood Foundation, an Isle of Man-based charity, it is staffed by volunteers and also promotes the races together with supporting new competitors.

Racing record

Motorcycle Grand Prix results

(key) (Races in bold indicate pole position)

Complete Formula One World Championship results
(key) (Races in italics indicate fastest lap)

Complete Formula One Non-Championship results
(key) (Races in italics indicate fastest lap)

Complete European F5000 Championship results
(key) (Races in bold indicate pole position; races in italics indicate fastest lap.)

Complete European Formula Two Championship results
(key) (Races in bold indicate pole position; races in italics indicate fastest lap)

 Graded drivers not eligible for  European Formula Two Championship points

Complete British Saloon Car Championship results
(key) (Races in bold indicate pole position; races in italics indicate fastest lap.)

24 Hours of Le Mans results

Footnotes

Sources
50 Years Of Moto Grand Prix (1st edition). Hazelton Publishing Ltd, 1999. 
Oxford Dictionary of National Biography

External links

    

 The Official Mike Hailwood website
 Mike Hailwood at the Isle of Man TT.com
 Mike Hailwood at TT supporters' website
 Motorcycle Hall of Fame
 Mike Hailwood's TT-winning Ducati 
 Heroes' Heroes: Murray Walker, former motor racing commentator, on Mike Hailwood preview only available, paywalled (non-free) content 
 Memories of Mike Hailwood
 The Mike Hailwood Memorial Run website

British motorcycle racers
English motorcycle racers
500cc World Championship riders
350cc World Championship riders
250cc World Championship riders
125cc World Championship riders
Isle of Man TT riders
English racing drivers
English Formula One drivers
Reg Parnell Racing Formula One drivers
Surtees Formula One drivers
McLaren Formula One drivers
European Formula Two Championship drivers
24 Hours of Le Mans drivers
Tasman Series drivers
International Motorsports Hall of Fame inductees
Segrave Trophy recipients
People from South Oxfordshire District
People from Tanworth-in-Arden
Members of the Order of the British Empire
Recipients of the George Medal
Road incident deaths in England
1940 births
1981 deaths
Burials in Warwickshire
People educated at Pangbourne College
World Sportscar Championship drivers
500cc World Riders' Champions
250cc World Riders' Champions
350cc World Riders' Champions